Nickel(II) iodide is an inorganic compound with the formula NiI2.  This paramagnetic black solid dissolves readily in water to give bluish-green solutions, from which crystallizes the aquo complex [Ni(H2O)6]I2 (image above). This bluish-green colour is typical of hydrated nickel(II) compounds. Nickel iodides find some applications in homogeneous catalysis.

Structure and synthesis
The anhydrous material crystallizes in the CdCl2 motif, featuring octahedral coordination geometry at each Ni(II) center. NiI2 is prepared by dehydration of the pentahydrate.

NiI2 readily hydrates, and the hydrated form can be prepared by dissolution of nickel oxide, hydroxide, or carbonate in hydroiodic acid. The anhydrous form can be produced by treating powdered nickel with iodine.

Applications in catalysis
NiI2 has some industrial applications as a catalyst in carbonylation reactions.  It is also has niche uses as a reagent in organic synthesis, especially in conjunction with samarium(II) iodide.

Like many nickel complexes, those derived from hydrated nickel iodide have been used in cross coupling.

References

Inorganic compounds
Iodides
Metal halides
Nickel compounds